Tomohito Yoneno (米野 智人, born January 21, 1982, in Sapporo) is a Japanese professional baseball catcher for the Hokkaido Nippon-Ham Fighters in Japan's Nippon Professional Baseball.

External links

NPB.com

1982 births
Living people
Baseball people from Sapporo
Japanese baseball players
Nippon Professional Baseball catchers
Yakult Swallows players
Tokyo Yakult Swallows players
Saitama Seibu Lions players
Hokkaido Nippon-Ham Fighters players
Japanese baseball coaches
Nippon Professional Baseball coaches